Armchair General was a bimonthly American military history magazine published by Weider History Group. It was in circulation between February 2004 and May 2015. The headquarters of the magazine was in Thousands Oaks, California.

History and profile
Armchair General was established in 2003. The first issue appeared in February 2004. It featured tactical situations which can be resolved by sending solutions to the magazine's staff. Modern warfare is also discussed in the form of "dispatches" (news briefs), movie, video game and war game reviews. In May 2015, the magazine stopped print publication.

The Armchair General website features complementary material as well as its own articles, many of which are written by readers of the print magazine and/or members of the site's online forum community.

In June 2005, the Chicago Tribune ranked Armchair General Magazine number 25 in their list of "Best 50 Magazines".

References

External links
Armchair General Magazine staff
Military and Service Magazines of the World's Forces, World War 2

2003 establishments in California
2015 disestablishments in California
Bimonthly magazines published in the United States
Defunct magazines published in the United States
History magazines published in the United States
Magazines established in 2003
Magazines disestablished in 2015
Magazines published in California
Military magazines published in the United States
Online magazines published in the United States
Online magazines with defunct print editions